The 1923 Tulsa Golden Hurricane football team represented the University of Tulsa during the 1923 college football season. In their second year under head coach Howard Acher, the Golden Hurricane compiled a 2–5–1 record and were outscored by their opponents by a combined total of 165 to 107.

Schedule

References

Tulsa
Tulsa Golden Hurricane football seasons
Tulsa Golden Hurricane football